Francis Clarence McGee (November 4, 1882 – September 16, 1916) was a Canadian ice hockey player for the Ottawa Hockey Club (also known as the Silver Seven) between 1903 and 1906. He played both as a centre and as a rover. He was also a civil servant for the Government of Canada and a lieutenant in the Canadian Army.

McGee was known as "One-Eyed" Frank McGee because he was blind in one eye due to a hockey injury. After missing two years of play due to the injury, he joined the senior Ottawa team in 1903. A legendary player of his era, and known as a prolific scorer, McGee once scored 14 goals in a Stanley Cup game and scored five goals or more in a game eight other times. Despite a brief senior career—only 45 games over four seasons—he helped Ottawa win and retain the Stanley Cup title from 1903 to 1906. 

After his hockey career ended, McGee worked with the Department of Indian Affairs in the Canadian federal government. During the First World War, he enlisted in the Canadian Expeditionary Force and died in battle in France in 1916. When the Hockey Hall of Fame was founded in 1945, McGee was in the first class of inductees.

Personal life
McGee was born on November 4, 1882, in Ottawa, Ontario. He came from a prominent Canadian family. His father, John Joseph McGee, was clerk of the Privy Council—a role considered to be the top civil servant position. His uncle, Thomas D'Arcy McGee, was a Father of Confederation and was assassinated in 1868. 

McGee was one of nine children born to John Joseph McGee and Elizabeth Helen McGee. His brother Jim was a noted athlete in rugby football and ice hockey, playing the latter with McGee in the 1903–04 season before dying in a horse-riding accident in May 1904. His brother Charles served in the Boer War and, like McGee, died in the First World War. His brother Walter also served in the First World War and was awarded the Military Cross for his efforts. 

McGee had a passion for sports; he participated in ice hockey, rugby football, lacrosse, and rowing. McGee played half-back for the Ottawa City football team, winning the Canadian championship in 1898. He later played quarterback for the team before quitting football in 1900. 

After finishing his schooling in Ottawa, McGee joined the Canadian government's Department of Indian Affairs.  He later assumed a role in the Department of the Interior. In 1904, his promotion within the Department led him to briefly retire from ice hockey. Historian Paul Kitchen has suggested that McGee's rise in the civil service was aided in part due to the connections of his father, a clerk of the Privy Council, and of William Foran, a hockey executive who also worked at the Board of Civil Service Examiners, the body that reviewed government promotions.

Hockey career

McGee first earned recognition for his hockey ability during the 1899–1900 season. During that season, he played for two teams: the Ottawa Aberdeens, who won the Quebec intermediate championship; and the Ottawa Canadian Pacific Railway (CPR) team, who won the Canadian Railway Hockey Union championship. On March 21, 1900, McGee was struck in his left eye by a "lifted puck" during an amateur game for a local CPR team. As a result, he lost vision in his left eye and did not play in the following two seasons, instead working as a referee.

In 1903, McGee decided to return to the sport, despite risking total blindness. Highly sought after, he joined the Ottawa Hockey Club of the senior Canadian Amateur Hockey League (CAHL). However, he excelled on the ice and was known to be strong and muscular, and was considered to have an ideal body type for the sport. In his first game with Ottawa, McGee scored two goals. He finished the 1903 season with 14 goals in six games, second overall in the league. He also played in all four Stanley Cup challenge games, scoring seven more goals and tying Jack Marshall for lead goalscorer.

Ottawa resigned from the CAHL after four games during the 1904 season due to a dispute over a delayed game; in those four games McGee recorded 12 goals, placing him first on the team in scoring and fifth overall in the league. During a Stanley Cup challenge against the Toronto Marlboros on February 25, 1904, he scored five goals in one game, setting a new record for most goals in a Cup game. He repeated the feat in a game on March 9 against the Brandon Hockey Club. Ottawa played in several Cup challenge series over the season, winning them all. That season, McGee had 21 goals in eight challenge games. In the off-season, McGee's brother Jim died in a horse-riding accident. Aware of the dangers of playing hockey, McGee's family wanted him to stop in light of Jim's death, but he decided to keep playing. 

Despite offers to reconcile by the CAHL, Ottawa joined the Federal Amateur Hockey League (FAHL) for the 1904–05 season. After a brief retirement from the sport, McGee returned, playing in six of the eight FAHL games and tying Marshall for best goalscorer in the league, with 17 goals each. During the season, Ottawa also played in five Cup challenge games against the Dawson City Nuggets and the Rat Portage Thistles. 

The Nuggets lost the first of the two-game series 9–2, but it was noteworthy that McGee only scored one goal in that game. After the first game, the Nuggets' manager reportedly dismissed McGee's talents, saying that he "doesn't seem to be any great scorer". In the next game, on January 16, 1905, McGee scored a record 14 goals in Ottawa's 23–2 win. This included eight consecutive goals scored in less than nine minutes. The fourteen goals he scored remain the most ever scored by a single player in a Stanley Cup hockey game. The game was also the most lopsided in Stanley Cup history, with Ottawa's 23 goals setting a record. Later, it was learned that McGee was playing with a fractured wrist, and he missed the first game of the series against the Thistles.

To resolve the disputes among top-level hockey in Canada, a new unified league was created in December 1905, the Eastern Canada Amateur Hockey Association (ECAHA), which Ottawa joined. McGee initially retired from hockey before the start of the 1906 season, but returned to the team midway through the season. Appearing in seven of the ten regular season games, McGee finished third in the ECAHA in scoring, with 28 goals. Ottawa finished tied for first in the league with the Montreal Wanderers, setting up a two game, total-goal series for the championship and the Stanley Cup. Montreal won 12–10, ending the Silver Seven's three-year reign. Including two other Cup challenge series played during the season, McGee had 17 goals in six challenge games. After Ottawa lost the Stanley Cup to the Wanderers, McGee retired from hockey at 23 years old. Historian Paul Kitchen suggests that McGee's retirement was due to both family pressure and an upcoming promotion he was to receive at the Department of the Interior, which would require his full attention.

Legacy
McGee was slightly shorter than the average Canadian man, but he was noted for being strong relative to his size and having a physical, at times rough, style of play. Frank Patrick, a contemporary of McGee, described McGee: "He was even better than they say he was. He had everything – speed, stickhandling, scoring ability and was a punishing checker. He was strongly built but beautifully proportioned and he had an almost animal rhythm."

McGee is best-known for being a prolific goal-scorer. During his career, he scored 135 goals in 45 games (both league and challenge). Only Russell Bowie rivals his average of three goals per game. With 14 goals against Dawson City, he holds the record for the most goals ever scored in a single Cup challenge match. In addition, McGee scored five or more goals in eight other senior matches, and his highest single-game total in regular-season play was eight on March 3, 1906, against the Montreal Hockey Club. 

McGee was one of the original nine players inducted into the Hockey Hall of Fame at its founding in 1945. In 1966, he was inducted into the Ottawa Sports Hall of Fame.

First World War

Prior to the beginning of the First World War, McGee and his brother Charles were members of the Non-Permanent Active Militia of Canada. When war broke out in August 1914, both were mobilized for active duty. It is not definitively known how McGee was allowed to join the army given his limited vision. The medical officer who examined him wrote that McGee could "see the required distance with either eye." According to biographer William Houston, McGee's nephew said that McGee tricked the doctor. Houston wrote, "When he was asked to cover one eye and read the chart, he covered his blind eye, and when required to cover the other eye, he switched hands instead of eyes."

McGee was initially assigned to the 43rd Regiment, Duke of Cornwall's Own Rifles, though on November 11, 1914, he was transferred to the 21st Infantry Battalion and appointed Temporary Lieutenant. The Battalion left for England in May 1915, and after spending the summer there, was transferred to the Western Front in France on September 14, 1915. On December 17, 1915, he incurred a knee injury near Dickebusch when the armoured car he was driving was blown into a ditch by a shell explosion. McGee was sent back to England on December 28 and spent several months recuperating. On July 7, 1916, McGee was medically cleared for active duty and he returned to service on August 29. He was given the option to transfer to a less-active post in Le Havre, but chose to return to his battalion, rejoining them on September 5. With his battalion, he took part in the Battle of the Somme. 

McGee was killed in action on September 16, 1916, near Courcelette, France; his body was never recovered. An artillery shell landed on or beside him and he was killed instantly. McGee was later mentioned in dispatches for actions he performed in the late morning on the day of his death. His brother Charles had previously died in action in May 1915 at the Battle of Festubert. Both of their names are inscribed on the Canadian National Vimy Memorial, along with all other Canadian soldiers killed in France with no known grave.

Career statistics

References

Notes

Citations

Bibliography

External links
 
  Obituary, as reproduced on the Library and Archives Canada web site

1882 births
1916 deaths
Canadian Expeditionary Force officers
Canadian ice hockey centres
Canadian military personnel killed in World War I
Canadian people of Irish descent
Hockey Hall of Fame inductees
Ice hockey people from Ottawa
Military personnel from Ottawa
McGee family
Ottawa Rough Riders players
Ottawa Senators (original) players
Players of Canadian football from Ontario
Sportspeople with a vision impairment
Stanley Cup champions